In computer programming, string interpolation (or variable interpolation, variable substitution, or variable expansion) is the process of evaluating a string literal containing one or more placeholders, yielding a result in which the placeholders are replaced with their corresponding values. It is a form of simple template processing or, in formal terms, a form of quasi-quotation (or logic substitution interpretation). The placeholder may be a variable name, or in some languages an arbitrary expression, in either case evaluated in the current context.

String interpolation is an alternative to building string via concatenation, which requires repeated quoting and unquoting; or substituting into a printf format string, where the variable is far from where it is used. Compare:
apples = 4
print("I have ${apples} apples.") # string interpolation
print("I have " + apples + " apples.") # string concatenation
print("I have %s apples.", apples) # format string

Two types of literal expression are usually offered: one with interpolation enabled, the other without. Non-interpolated strings may also escape sequences, in which case they are termed a raw string, though in other cases this is separate, yielding three classes of raw string, non-interpolated (but escaped) string, interpolated (and escaped) string. For example, in Unix shells, single-quoted strings are raw, while double-quoted strings are interpolated. Placeholders are usually represented by a bare or a named sigil (typically $ or %), e.g. $apples or %apples, or with braces, e.g. {apples}, sometimes both, e.g. ${apples}. In some cases additional formatting specifiers can be used (as in printf), e.g. {apples:3}, and in some cases the formatting specifiers themselves can be interpolated, e.g. {apples:width}. Expansion of the string usually occurs at run time.

Language support for string interpolation varies widely. Some languages do not offer string interpolation, instead using concatenation, simple formatting functions, or template libraries. String interpolation is common in many programming languages which make heavy use of string representations of data, such as Apache Groovy, Julia, Kotlin, Perl, PHP, Python, Ruby, Scala, Swift, Tcl and most Unix shells.

Algorithms 
There are two main types of variable-expanding algorithms for variable interpolation:
 Replace and expand placeholders: creating a new string from the original one, by find–replace operations. Find variable reference (placeholder), replace it by its variable value. This algorithm offers no cache strategy.
 Split and join string: splitting the string into an array, merging it with the corresponding array of values, then joining items by concatenation. The split string can be cached for reuse.

Security issues 
String interpolation, like string concatenation, may lead to security problems. If user input data is improperly escaped or filtered, the system will be exposed to SQL injection, script injection, XML external entity (XXE) injection, and cross-site scripting (XSS) attacks.

An SQL injection example:
 query = " "
If $id is replaced with "'; ", executing this query will wipe out all the data in Table.

Examples

ABAP 

DATA(apples) = 4.
WRITE |I have { apples } apples|.The output will be:I have 4 apples

Bash 

apples=4
echo "I have $apples apples"
# or
echo "I have ${apples} apples"
The output will be:
I have 4 apples

Boo 

apples = 4
print("I have $(apples) apples")
# or
print("I have {0} apples" % apples)
The output will be:
I have 4 apples

C# 

var apples = 4;
var bananas = 3;

Console.WriteLine($"I have {apples} apples");
Console.WriteLine($"I have {apples + bananas} fruits");

The output will be:
I have 4 apples
I have 7 fruits

ColdFusion Markup Language 

ColdFusion Markup Language (CFML) script syntax:
apples = 4;
writeOutput("I have #apples# apples");

Tag syntax:
<cfset apples = 4>
<cfoutput>I have #apples# apples</cfoutput>

The output will be:

CoffeeScript 

apples = 4
console.log "I have #{apples} apples"
The output will be:
I have 4 apples

Dart 

int apples = 4, bananas = 3;
print('I have $apples apples.');
print('I have ${apples+bananas} fruits.');
The output will be:
I have 4 apples.
I have 7 fruits.

Go 

, Go does not have string interpolation. There have been some proposals for string interpolation in the next version of the language, Go 2. Instead, Go uses printf format strings in the fmt.Sprintf function, string concatenation, or template libraries like text/template.

Groovy 

In groovy, interpolated strings are known as GStrings:
def quality = "superhero"
final age = 52
def sentence = "A developer is a $quality if he is ${age <= 42 ? 'young' : 'seasoned'}"
println sentence
The output will be:
A developer is a superhero if he is seasoned

Haxe 

var apples = 4;
var bananas = 3;
trace('I have $apples apples.');
trace('I have ${apples+bananas} fruits.');
The output will be:
I have 4 apples.
I have 7 fruits.

Java 

, Java does not have interpolated strings, and instead uses format functions, notably the MessageFormat class (Java version 1.1 and above) and the static method String.format (Java version 5 and above). There is a proposal to add string interpolation to the Java language. This proposal aims at doing safe string interpolation, making it easier to prevent injection attacks.

JavaScript 

JavaScript, as of the ECMAScript 2015 (ES6) standard, supports string interpolation using backticks ``. This feature is called template literals. Here is an example:
const apples = 4;
const bananas = 3;
console.log(`I have ${apples} apples`);
console.log(`I have ${apples + bananas} fruits`);
The output will be:
I have 4 apples
I have 7 fruits

Template literals can also be used for multi-line strings:
console.log(`This is the first line of text.
This is the second line of text.`);

The output will be:
This is the first line of text.
This is the second line of text.

Julia 

apples = 4
bananas = 3
print("I have $apples apples and $bananas bananas, making $(apples + bananas) pieces of fruit in total.")
The output will be:
I have 4 apples and 3 bananas, making 7 pieces of fruit in total.

Kotlin 

val quality = "superhero"
val apples = 4
val bananas = 3
val sentence = "A developer is a $quality. I have ${apples + bananas} fruits"
println(sentence)
The output will be:
A developer is a superhero. I have 7 fruits

Nemerle 

def apples = 4;
def bananas = 3;
Console.WriteLine($"I have $apples apples.");
Console.WriteLine($"I have $(apples + bananas) fruit.");
It also supports advanced formatting features, such as:
def fruit = ["apple", "banana"];
Console.WriteLine($<#I have ..$(fruit; "\n"; f => f + "s")#>);
The output will be:
apples
bananas

Nim 

Nim provides string interpolation via the strutils module.
Formatted string literals inspired by Python F-string are provided via the strformat module,
the strformat macro verifies that the format string is well-formed and well-typed,
and then are expanded into Nim source code at compile-time.
import strutils, strformat
var apples = 4
var bananas = 3
echo "I have $1 apples".format(apples)
echo fmt"I have {apples} apples"
echo fmt"I have {apples + bananas} fruits"

# Multi-line
echo fmt"""
I have 
{apples} apples"""

# Debug the formatting
echo fmt"I have {apples=} apples"

# Custom openChar and closeChar characters
echo fmt("I have (apples) {apples}", '(', ')')

# Backslash inside the formatted string literal
echo fmt"""{ "yep\nope" }""" 
The output will be:
I have 4 apples
I have 4 apples
I have 7 fruits
I have
4 apples
I have apples=4 apples
I have 4 {apples}
yep
ope

Nix 

let numberOfApples = "4";
in "I have ${numberOfApples} apples"
The output will be:
I have 4 apples

ParaSail 

const Apples := 4
const Bananas := 3
Println ("I have `(Apples) apples.\n")
Println ("I have `(Apples+Bananas) fruits.\n")
The output will be:
I have 4 apples.
I have 7 fruits.

Perl 

my $apples = 4;
my $bananas = 3;
print "I have $apples apples.\n";
print "I have @{[$apples+$bananas]} fruit.\n";  # Uses the Perl array (@) interpolation.
The output will be:
I have 4 apples.
I have 7 fruit.

PHP 

<?php
$apples = 5;
$bananas = 3;
echo "There are $apples apples and $bananas bananas.";
echo "\n";
echo "I have {$apples} apples and {$bananas} bananas.";The output will be:
There are 5 apples and 3 bananas.
I have 5 apples and 3 bananas.

Python 

Python supports string interpolation as of version 3.6, referred to as 
"formatted string literals". Such a literal begins with an f or F before the opening quote, and uses braces for placeholders:
apples = 4
bananas = 3
print(f'I have {apples} apples and {bananas} bananas')
The output will be:
I have 4 apples and 3 bananas

Ruby / Crystal 

apples = 4
puts "I have #{apples} apples"
# or
puts "I have %s apples" % apples
# or
puts "I have %{a} apples" % {a: apples}

The output will be:
I have 4 apples

Rust 

Rust does not have general string interpolation, but provides similar functionality via macros, referred to as "Captured identifiers in format strings", introduced in version 1.58.0, released 2022-01-13.

Rust provides formatting via the std::fmt module, which is interfaced with through various macros such as format!, write!, and print!. These macros are converted into Rust source code at compile-time, whereby each argument interacts with a formatter. The formatter supports positional parameters, named parameters, argument types, defining various formatting traits, and capturing identifiers from the environment.

let (apples, bananas) = (4, 3);
// println! captures the identifiers when formatting: the string itself isn't interpolated by Rust.
println!("There are {apples} apples and {bananas} bananas.");
The output will be:
 There are 4 apples and 3 bananas.

Scala 

Scala 2.10+ has implemented the following string interpolators: s, f and raw. It is also possible to write custom ones or override the standard ones.

The f interpolator is a compiler macro that rewrites a format string with embedded expressions as an invocation of String.format. It verifies that the format string is well-formed and well-typed.

The standard interpolators 
Scala 2.10+'s string interpolation allows embedding variable references directly in processed string literals. Here is an example:
val apples = 4
val bananas = 3
//before Scala 2.10
printf("I have %d apples\n", apples)
println("I have %d apples" format apples)
//Scala 2.10+
println(s"I have $apples apples")
println(s"I have ${apples + bananas} fruits")
println(f"I have $apples%d apples")

The output will be:I have 4 apples

Sciter (tiscript) 
In Sciter any function with name starting from $ is considered as interpolating function and so interpolation is customizable and context sensitive:
var apples = 4
var bananas = 3
var domElement = ...;

domElement.$content(<p>I have {apples} apples</p>);
domElement.$append(<p>I have {apples + bananas} fruits</p>);

Where domElement.$content(<p>I have {apples} apples</p>); gets compiled to this:
domElement.html = "<p>I have " + apples.toHtmlString() + " apples</p>";

Snobol 

   apples = 4 ; bananas = 3
   Output = "I have " apples " apples."
   Output = "I have "  (apples + bananas) " fruits."
The output will be:
I have 4 apples.
I have 7 fruits.

Swift

In Swift, a new String value can be created from a mix of constants, variables, literals, and expressions by including their values inside a string literal. Each item inserted into the string literal is wrapped in a pair of parentheses, prefixed by a backslash.

let apples = 4
print("I have \(apples) apples")The output will be:
I have 4 apples

Tcl 

The Tool Command Language has always supported string interpolation in all quote-delimited strings.

set apples 4
puts "I have $apples apples."
The output will be:
I have 4 apples.

In order to actually format - and not simply replace - the values, there is a formatting function.

set apples 4
puts [format "I have %d apples." $apples]

TypeScript 

As of version 1.4, TypeScript supports string interpolation using backticks ``. Here is an example:
var apples: number = 4;
console.log(`I have ${apples} apples`);
The output will be:
I have 4 apples
The console.log function can be used as a printf function. The above example can be rewritten, thusly:
var apples: number = 4;
console.log("I have %d apples", apples);
The output remains the same.

Visual Basic 
As of Visual Basic 14, string interpolation is supported in Visual Basic.
 
name = "Tom"
Console.WriteLine($"Hello, {name}")

will print "Hello, Tom".

See also 
 Concatenation
 Improper input validation
 printf format string
 Quasi-quotation
 String literal
 Substitution

Notes 

Programming constructs
Interpolation
Variable (computer science)